Alexa Wilkinson is an American singer-songwriter, guitarist and trumpet player. As a solo artist from 2006 to 2011, she recorded two full-length albums, and one EP. She is now a member of the band, "Mother's Daughter" with Jessie Standafer. While solo, she toured with a number of indie musicians, including Josh Kelley, Ingrid Michaelson, Joshua Radin, Jonathan Clay, Vanessa Carlton and Kate Voegele,. Alexa Wilkinson's song, 'Miles Away' was featured on MTV's The Hills.

Biography
Alexa Wilkinson was born in Cherry Hill, New Jersey but moved to Park City, Utah at age 12. She began playing the trumpet at age 10, after being convinced to do so by a childhood sweetheart, and took up the acoustic guitar a year later. She graduated from Park City High School before taking up music as a full-time career.

Alexa Wilkinson was "discovered" by Josh Kelley in 2006 after a chance meeting with Josh's then girlfriend and now wife, Katherine Heigl. Josh signed her his independent record label, DNK Records and cowrote several songs with Alexa.  In June 2007, aged 20, she released her debut album, Lullaby Appetite.  Many of the songs on Lullaby Appetite were taken from the apparently independently released album Just You Wait (2006).

Alexa's second album, Lions, was released in April 2008.  The first single off the album is 'Vanilla Rain' (for which a video has been made). The title track "Lions" has been featured on CSI NY (Episode 512 "She's Not There"), as well as "Lullaby Appetite" featured on ABC Family's Make It or Break It.

After touring 2008–2009 with Joshua Radin, Ingrid Michaelson, and Vanessa Carlton, she left DNK Records to pursue an independent career. She then recorded her third EP, "Mechanical Circles" With producer Dave Pittenger in 2011 before taking a step down from her music career in 2012.

Alexa has since come out as Queer, and is now a member of the band Mother's Daughter. Mother's Daughter is a 100% collaborative project by Jessie Standafer & Alexa Wilkinson. Their music fuses our traditional Americana roots with modern live production, skillfully tight vocal harmonies, and original lyrics. They've performed at sold-out Rockwood Music Hall concerts, the National Women's Music Festival, and venues around the country. The singer-songwriter duo also play acoustic guitar, percussion, piano/keys/MIDI, trumpet, and ukulele in their songs.

They have released four singles since January 2020, with their latest single "Give It Time". All proceeds from “Give It Time” will go towards the Black Banjo Reclamation Project, a vehicle to return instruments of African origin to the descendants of their original makers.

Band
Alexa Wilkinson's band is currently a member of "Mother's Daughter"

Mother's Daughter is a 100% collaborative project by Jessie Standafer & Alexa Wilkinson. They are a product of the women who created them. They are the bridge that connects past to present, matter to spirit, tradition to progress. Their music fuses our traditional Americana roots with modern live production, skillfully tight vocal harmonies, and lyrics that seek to understand their connection to the past...so that they may create the future. They've performed at sold-out Rockwood Music Hall concerts, the National Women's Music Festival, and venues around the country. The singer-songwriter duo also play acoustic guitar, percussion, piano/keys/MIDI, trumpet, and ukulele in their songs.

Solo Discography
Lullaby Appetite
Lions
Just You Wait (2006)
Lullaby Appetite (2007, DNK Records)
Lions (2008, DNK Records)

Mother's Daughter Discography
Boundaries - Single (2020)
Focus - Single (2020)
You Bring The Sun - Single (2020)
Give It Time - Single (2020)

References

Park Record (Park City, UT). July 30, 2005.  Alexa Wilkinson debuts in a leading role. by Matt James, of the Record staff

External links
 Official website

1987 births
Living people
American alternative rock musicians
American women singer-songwriters
American women pop singers
American women rock singers
American rock songwriters
Singer-songwriters from New Jersey
People from Cherry Hill, New Jersey
Alternative rock singers
Guitarists from Utah
Guitarists from New Jersey
21st-century American guitarists
21st-century American women guitarists
21st-century American singers
21st-century American women singers
Singer-songwriters from Utah